Sacred Heart Girls' College (SHGC) is an independent Roman Catholic secondary school for girls from years 7 to 12 located in the Melbourne south-eastern suburb of Oakleigh, in Victoria, Australia. It was opened in 1957 by the Sisters of Our Lady of the Missions (RNDM). The College houses approximately 1000 students, and continues to grow. It has a proud history of strong academic performance and provides many curricular and co-curricular activities for its students including a vibrant music program, a multitude of sporting opportunities, an Outdoor Learning Program, public speaking and debating.

The school is affiliated with the Alliance of Girls' Schools Australasia (AGSA), as well as the South Eastern Sporting Group (SESG) and the Secondary Catholic Sporting Association (SCSA).

The school offers the Victorian Certificate of Education (VCE), and consistently ranks in the Top 100 schools in Victoria for VCE, as well as in the Top 10 Catholic schools in Victoria for VCE.

In 2022, the school celebrates 65 years of educating young women at their current Warrigal Road campus.

History

Sacred Heart Girls' College was founded by the Sisters of Our Lady of the Missions (RNDMs) in 1957, built on the wonderful traditions of their founder, Euphrasie Barbier. It was she who had a dream "that all people would be loved, honoured and respected for the wonderful gifts of their difference and the amazing gifts of our oneness".

Crest

Crown
The crown symbolises a reward for excellence. It is mentioned several times in the Christian Scriptures as a reward for those who have persevered in doing right.
(1 Peter 5:4; 2 Tim 4: 6–8; Revelations 2: 10)

The palm/laurel branches
The palm or laurel branches symbolise victory. In ancient times the winner of a race was given a laurel wreath in recognition of their victory; at Jesus’ triumphant entry to Jerusalem, the crowds waved palm branches as a sign of his coming victory over death. We are reminded that our lives can be seen as a struggle to win the prize of victory given to us when we uphold our Christian faith. The leaves of our crest are symbolic of reward and victory. St. Paul reminds us that we should not make material rewards our only goal but strive towards eternal and spiritual rewards.

Shield
The shield signifies protection. The training and ideals imparted to us during our College life will act as armour and be a source of strength in our future lives.
(Eph 6:10–23; Ps, 5: 13.) The letters V and K stand for Virtue and Knowledge which reminds us that learning is important but even more important is our living out of our Christian ideals. The letters S and H stand for the Sacred Heart, symbolising the great love that Jesus has for us all, and that we should strive to spread that love to others.

Scroll
In ancient times, any important document was written on a scroll. Hence our motto and the name of our College are written on scrolls to emphasise their importance. The College motto is "Semper Superne Nitens" which means 'Always Striving Upwards'. Every student is encouraged to strive towards higher standards – in spiritual development and a closer familiarity with God, in personal behaviour and character development, and in pursuit of higher academic standards.

House teams
Interhouse competitions remain an integral part of the College's ethos. The four Houses with their associated colours are:
 
 
 
 

The names for the Houses were derived from the traditions and heritage of the RNDM. The students are placed into one of the Houses upon starting at the College. The House teams participate in sporting events, such as annual swimming carnivals, athletics carnivals and house netball & cross country competitions. The Houses also participate in a House arts festival, in which each House exhibits performances relating to song, dance and acting for the College.

Bede
The Bede House colour is red. Bede House was named in honour of Mother Mary St. Bede. She was a pioneer member of the congregation in England and a great educator who gave constant encouragement to the Sisters during their difficult years when establishing a school in Western Australia.

Paul
The Paul House colour is gold. Paul House was named in honour of Paul the Apostle. He was fired with great missionary spirit and used sporting examples as a picture of the Christian life. In 1 Corinthians 9:24–26, he challenges us not just to race, but to race to win, saying, "Do you not know that in a race all the runners run, but only one receives the prize? So run that you may obtain it. Every athlete exercises self-control in all things. They do it to receive a perishable wreath, but we an imperishable. So I do not run aimlessly; I do not box as one beating the air."

Trinity
The Trinity House colour is blue. Trinity House is named in honour to the Trinity; the existence of God as three divine persons: the Father, Son (Jesus Christ), and the Holy Spirit. Although they operate according to their own unique properties, at the same time, they commonly operate grace and creation; a symbol for harmony and teamwork.

Xavier
The Xavier House colour is emerald green. Xavier House was named in honour of Francis Xavier by Sister Mary Clement who was a sports mistress. The missionary Francis Xavier had three virtues: a great desire to bring souls to the Sacred Heart of Jesus, an heroic obedience, and a great spirit of sacrifice. He is the patron of missionaries in foreign lands, and of Australia, China, India, Indonesia, Mongolia, New Zealand and Pakistan.

Notable alumni
 Faustina "Fuzzy" AgolleyVideo Hits host
 Gabriella CilmiARIA Music Award winner, singer-songwriter
 Samantha Downiethird-place winner of Australia's Next Top Model, Cycle 4

See also

 Sacred Heart Girls' College building, Oakleigh, designed by Frederick Romberg
 List of non-government schools in Victoria, Australia
 List of high schools in Melbourne

References

External links

 Official website

Educational institutions established in 1957
Catholic secondary schools in Melbourne
Girls' schools in Victoria (Australia)
1957 establishments in Australia
Alliance of Girls' Schools Australasia
Buildings and structures in the City of Monash